Also known as the Inside-Out web, Worldbeam is the brainchild of David Gelernter and Ajay Royan proposed in 2007; it envisions a single logical repository for all information on the internet, a concept not unlike what is now referred to as the "cloud".

See also
 Information explosion

References
 "The Next Fifty Years: Science in the First Half of the Twenty-first Century" Edited by John Brockman, Vintage (2002)

External links
 The Inside-Out Web

Information Age